was a village located in Ochi District, Ehime Prefecture, Japan.

As of 2003, the village had an estimated population of 2,214 and a density of 192.35 persons per km2. The total area was 11.51 km2.

On October 1, 2004, Iwagi, along with the town of Yuge, and the villages of Ikina and Uoshima (all from Ochi District), was merged to create the town of Kamijima and no longer exists as an independent municipality, although it remains the unofficial name for the island proper, as the rest of the merged municipalities are on other islands.

External links
Official website of Kamijima  in Japanese

Dissolved municipalities of Ehime Prefecture
Kamijima, Ehime